Don Aurelio Mosquera Narváez (2 August 1883 – 17 November 1939) was an Ecuadorian politician who served as President of Ecuador from December 1938 to November 1939.

Mosquera was born in Quito. He studied medicine in Quito, then traveled to Paris to continue his education. Upon his return, he achieved great success as a professor, dean, and rector of the Central University of Ecuador. He was elected head of the Ecuadorian Radical Liberal Party. He was also vice president of the Chamber of Deputies and of the Senate. In 1938, after the dismissal of Manuel María Borrero, he was named President of Ecuador. During his short time as president, with the support of the army, he dissolved the National Assembly and reestablished the Constitution of 1906, known for its secularity. His term as president ended when he died on 17 November 1939 in Quito.

Mosquera was supported by socialists and liberals. He closed the Central University and the Juan Montalvo school. He created organizations to support artisans and small business owners.

External links

 Official Website of the Ecuadorian Government about the country President's History
http://www.worldstatesmen.org/Ecuador.html

1883 births
1939 deaths
Academic staff of the Central University of Ecuador
Presidents of Ecuador
Ecuadorian Radical Liberal Party politicians